Stash Box is the second EP-CD from the Kottonmouth Kings released only in Japan to support the upcoming Japanese tour. The CD was released on March 10, 1999. "Dog's Life" was taken from the release ROYAL HIGHNESS and the rest of the songs were released later in the year on the album Hidden Stash.

Track listing

Personnel
Daddy X - Vocals, Lyrics
D-Loc - Vocals, Lyrics
Saint Dog - Vocals, Lyrics
Lou Dogg - Drums, Percussion
DJ Bobby B - DJ, Turntables, Engineer, Programmer
Dog Boy - Vocals, Lyrics (Dogs Life)

References 

Kottonmouth Kings albums
2003 albums
Suburban Noize Records albums